Wickham National Park is a national park in South East Queensland, Australia.  The park is located in Cedar Creek near Yarrabilba.  Bushwalking, mountain bike riding and horseriding are popular activities taken place in the park. Wickham National Park has a sub-tropical climate and lies within the Albert River water catchment.

See also

Protected areas of Queensland

References

National parks of South East Queensland